Khastegi (Persian: خستگی; also known as Tedium and Sex My Life) is a 2008 Persian independent film written and directed by Bahman Motamedian and produced in Iran. It was shown at the 65th Venice International Film Festival in 2008.

Plot
Khastegi (aka Tedium) tells the story of seven Iranian transsexuals living in Tehran.

Screenings
 24th BFI London Lesbian and Gay Film Festival (BFI) (March 17–31, 2010/ London, England) 
 Cinema Digital Seoul Film Festival (CinDi) (August 19–25, 2009 / Seoul, South Korea) 
 Chelsea Art Museum (July 15- August 19, 2009 / New York, USA) 
 19th Toronto LGBT Film Festival (May 14–24, 2009 / Toronto, Ontario, Canada) 
 24th Torino GBLT Film Festival (23–3 April 2009 / Torino, Italy) 
 Prague international Film Festival (Febiofest) (26 March-3 April 2009 / Prague, Czech Republic)
 Mexico City International Contemporary Film Festival (FICCO) (17 Feb. - 1 Mar. 2009 / Mexico, Mexico City)
 Asia Pacific Festival of 1st Films (4–10 December 2008 / Singapore)
 Three Continents Festival, Nantes (22 November - 2 December 2008 / Nantes, French)
 Sao Paulo Film Festival (17–30 October 2008 / São Paulo, Brazil)
  Venice Film Festival (August 27- September 6, 2008 / Venice, Italy)

Awards and nominations
Awards the first prize	(24th Torino GBLT Film Festival 23–3 April 2009 / Torino, Italy) 
Special citation (Best producer) (Asia Pacific Festival of 1st Films/ 4–10 December 2008/ Singapore)
Brian Award (65th Venice International Film Festival / August 27 to September 6, 2008) 
Queer Lion Award 	(65th Venice International Film Festival / August 27 to September 6, 2008)

References

External links
 
 

2008 films
2008 drama films
Transgender-related films
Films set in Iran
2000s Persian-language films
Iranian LGBT-related films
2008 LGBT-related films